Fredrik Anton Martin Olsen Nalum (13 May 1854 – 19 January 1935) was a Norwegian educator and politician for the Liberal Party. He held three different government minister posts, served as mayor and was a six-term member of Parliament.

He was born at Tanum in Brunlanes as a son of farmer Peder Martin Olsen Aaros (1817–1859) and Anne Olea Olsen Falkenberg (1816–1967). He attended school in the city Larvik, graduated from Asker Seminary in 1872 and returned to Brunlanes as a school teacher from 1872 to 1909. He was also a farmer, having bought the farm Nalum in 1881 and later the farm Foldvik. He quit as a farmer in 1926, and his son bought the farmland in 1928.

He was a member of Brunlanes municipal council from 1883 to 1916, serving as mayor since 1892. He was an elector from 1883 to 1903, before entering election himself. He was elected to the Parliament of Norway from Brunla in 1906, and was re-elected in 1909, 1912, 1915, 1918 and 1921. He served as President of the Storting during his fourth term, and also President of the Odelsting from 1920 to 1921.

From 1916 to 1920 he was the Minister of Labour in Knudsen's Second Cabinet. He was involved in transport politics in Parliament, and was also a board member of the Norwegian State Railways from 1910 to 1922 and supervisory commission member of the Jarlsberg Line from 1903 to 1911. Being a teacher, he was also involved in education politics, and was a member of the municipal and county school boards. In Blehr's Second Cabinet which served from 1921 to 1923 he was named as Minister of Education and Church Affairs, and also served as Minister of Agriculture from June to July 1921.

After retiring he lived at the family farm. He died in Nanset, Hedrum in 1935. He was buried in Tanum, and a memorial stone was raised there in November 1939.

References

1854 births
1935 deaths
People from Larvik
Norwegian educators
Mayors of places in Vestfold
Government ministers of Norway
Presidents of the Storting
Members of the Storting
Liberal Party (Norway) politicians
Ministers of Education of Norway